Spankmaster is the sixth solo studio album by American rapper and producer Kool Keith. It was released on June 5, 2001, via Overcore with distribution by TVT Records. The record features production and guest appearances from Jacky Jasper and Esham.

Music and lyrics 
Kool Keith signed to Gothom/Overcore, with distribution through TVT Records in 2001.Allmusic's Jason Birchmeier says that Spankmaster "heads even further toward insanity than his preceding trilogy of albums for Funky Ass foreshadowed", referring to Keith's albums Sex Style, First Come, First Served (released under the alias Dr. Dooom), and Matthew. The production, provided by Keith, Overcore founder Santos, Esham, and rapper Jacky Jasper, heavily features live instrumentation. Keith's lyrics derive from antagonism, eccentricity and sleaze.

Reception 

AllMusic reviewer Jason Birchmeier gave the album 3 out of 5 stars, writing, "Recommended to the open-minded, particularly if you admire creativity, long for the uncanny, and secretly have a desire for perversity. Definitely not for the lighthearted." Robert Christgau named "Dark Vadar" as a "choice cut", indicating a good song on "an album that isn't worth your time or money." The album was mildly successful making it to number 48 on the Top R&B/Hip-Hop Albums, number 11 on the Independent Albums and number 16 on the Top Heatseekers charts in the U.S.

Track listing

Charts

References

External links

2001 albums
Kool Keith albums
Albums produced by Esham